Faunia is a zoo and a botanical garden located in Madrid, Spain. It covers about fourteen square hectares and is organized into areas representing different ecosystems, such as jungle, polar regions, and African forest. It is owned by Parques Reunidos, SA.

Faunia was opened on July 10, 2001, under the name Parque Biológico de Madrid.  In 2002, the park was renamed Faunia, a name created by the philologist and writer, Fernando Beltrán. The author of the project was Ricardo Novaro Bocco.

In 2014, Faunia received 400,867 visitors.

Species

Invertebrates

Arachnids  
 Mexican redknee tarantula (Brachypelma smithi)   
 Red-legged tarantula (Nhandu carapoensis) 
 Tarántula de Seeman (Aphonopelma seemanni)

Insects  
 Giant stick insect (Eurycnema goliath)
 Vietnam stick insect (Baculum extradentatum)
 Atlas butterfly (Attacus atlas) 
 Zebra butterfly (Heliconius charithonia) 
 Blue morpho butterfly (genus Morpho)

Fish
 Koi carp (Cyprinus carpio) 
 Peters' elephantnose fish (Gnathonemus petersi)
 Tetra (Astyanax fasciatus) 
 Red lionfish (Pterois volitans) 
 Arapaima (Arapaima gigas)
 Seahorses (genus Hippocampus) 
 Redtail catfish (Phractocephalus hemioliopterus) 
 Four-eyed fish (Anableps anableps) 
 Red-bellied piranha (Pygocentrus nattereri) 
 Red-bellied pacu (Piaractus brachypomus) 
 Ocellate river stingray (Potamotrygon motoro) 
 Spotted gar (Lepisosteus oculatus) 
 Brown garden eel (Heteroconger longissimus)
 Blacktip reef shark (Carcharinus melanopterus) 
 Regal tang (paracanthurus hepatus) 
 Raccoon butterflyfish (Chaetodon lunula) 
 Striated frogfish (Antennarius striatus)
 Domino damsel (Dascyllus trimaculatus) 
 Barcheek unicornfish (Naso lituratus)
 Yellow tang (Zebrasoma flavescens)

Amphibians 
 Axolotl (Ambystoma mexicanum) 
 African clawed frog (Xenopus laevis)

Reptiles 
 Indian python (Python molurus) 
 Rock monitor (Varanus albigularis)
 Spectacled caiman (Caiman crocodylus) 
 Common iguana (Iguana iguana)
 Boa constrictor (Boa constrictor) 
 Fiji Iguana (Brachylophus fasciatus) 
 Monocled cobra (Naja kaouthia) 
 Amethystine (Morelia amethistina) 
 Central bearded dragon (Pogona vitticeps) 
 Nile crocodile (Crocodylus niloticus) 
 Komodo dragon ( Varanus komodoensis)

Aves 
 American flamingo (Phoenicopterus ruber)
 Lesser flamingo (Phoenicopterus minor)
 Mallard (Anas platyrhynchos)
 White-cheeked pintail (Anas bahamensis)
 Chestnut teal (Anas castanea)
 Mute swan (Cygnus olor)
 Black swan (Cygnus atratus)
 Black-necked swan (Cygnus melanocoryphus)
 Red-crested pochard (Netta rufina)
 Common shelduck (Tadorna tadorna)
 Ruddy shelduck (Tadorna ferruginea)
 Emperor goose (Anser canagicus)
 Mandarin duck (Aix galericulata)
 Fulvous whistling duck (Dendrocygna bicolor)
 Canada goose (Branta canadensis)
 Barnacle goose (Branta leucopsis)
 Goose (Branta ruficollis)
 Saker falcon (Falco cherrug)
 Griffon vulture (Gyps fulvus)
 Black-chested buzzard-eagle (Geranoaetus melanoleucus)
 Grey pelican (Pelecanus rufescens)
 Great white pelican (Pelecanus onocrotalus)
 Great cormorant (Phalacrocorax carbo)
 Black oystercatcher (Haematopus bachmani)
 Helmeted guineafowl (Numida meleagris)
 Grey crowned crane (Balearica regulorum)
 Purple starling (Lamprotornis purpureus)
 Cattle egret (Bubulcus ibis)
 Black-throated magpie-jay (Calocitta colliei)
 Crested magpie (Cyanocorax sp.)
 European herring gull (Larus argentatus) 
 Grey-headed gull (Larus cirrocephalus) 
 King penguin (Aptenodytes patagonicus) 
 Chinstrap penguin (Pygoscelis antarctica) 
 Gentoo penguin (Pygoscelis papua)
 Adélie penguin (Pygoscelis adeliae)
 Southern rockhopper penguin (Eudyptes chrysocome) 
 Magellanic penguin (Spheniscus magellanicus) 
 Humboldt penguin (Spheniscus humboldti)
 Giant wood rail (Aramides ypecaha) 
 Chestnut-mandibled toucan (Ramphastos swainsonii) 
 Yellow-naped amazon (Amazona auropalliata) 
 Yellow-knobbed curassow (Crax daubentoni) 
 Scarlet ibis (Eudocimus ruber) 
 Grey-winged trumpeter (Psophia crepitans) 
 Toco toucan (Ramphastos toco) 
 Sun parakeet (Aratinga solstirialis) 
 Yellow and blue macaw (Ara ararauna) 
 Scarlet macaw (Ara macao) 
 Greater rhea (Rhea americana) 
 Silver pheasant (Lophura nycthemera) 
 Lady Amherst pheasant (Chrysolophus amherstiae) 
 Common crane (Grus grus) 
 Demoiselle crane (Anthropoides virgo)

Mammals 
 Prairie dog (Cynomys ludovicianus) 
 Large-headed capuchin (Cebus apella)
 Guinea pig (Cavia porcellus) 
 Domestic sheep (Ovis aries)
 Pony (Equus caballus) 
 Domestic goat (Capra aegagrus hircus)
 Vietnamese pig (Sus scrofa domestica) 
 African wild ass (Equus africanus) 
 Domestic goat (Capra hircus) 
 Harbor seal (Phoca vitulina) 
 Steller sea lion (Eumetopias jubatus) 
 Brown fur seal (Arctocephalus pusillus) 
 Indian flying fox (Pteropus giganteus)
 Seba's short-tailed bat (Carollia perspicillata)
 South African springhare (Pedetes capensis) 
 Striped skunk (Mephitis mephitis) 
 Linnaeus's two-toed sloth (Choloepus didactylus) 
 Three-striped night monkey (Aotus trivirgatus) 
 Egyptian fruit bat (Rousettus aegyptiacus) 
 Crested porcupine (Hystrix cristata) 
 Gray mouse lemur (Microcebus murinus) 
 Binturong (Arctictis binturong) 
 Aardvark (Orycteropus afer) 
 Common genet (Genetta genetta)
 Short-tailed chinchilla (Chinchilla chinchilla) 
 Ocelot (Leopardus pardalis) 
 Nine-banded armadillo (Dasypus novemcinctus) 
 Kinkajou (Potos flavus) 
 Black-and-white ruffed lemur (Varecia variegata) 
 Raccoon (Procyon lotor) 
 White-headed lemur (Eulemur albifrons)
 Ring-tailed lemur (Lemur catta) 
 Southern tamandua (Tamandua tetradactyla) 
 Golden lion tamarin (Leontopithecus rosalia) 
 Goeldi's marmoset (Callimico goeldii) 
 Black agouti (Dasyprocta fuliginosa)
 White-faced saki (Pithecia pithecia) 
 Common squirrel monkey (Saimiri sciureus)
 Desmarest's hutia (Capromys pilorides)
 Emperor tamarin (Saguinus imperator)
 Common marmoset (Callithrix jacchus) 
 Pygmy marmoset (Callithrix pygmaea) 
 Naked mole-rat (Heterocephalus glaber)
 Common dwarf mongoose (Helogale parvula) 
 Reeves's muntjac (Muntiacus reevesi) 
 Gray brocket (Mazama gouazoubira) 
 Golden lion tamarin (Leontopithecus rosalia)

Conservation programs 
In 2007 and 2008, Faunia participated in seven EEP and nine ESB programs coordinated by EAZA.

In 2012, 12 out of the 143 species in the collection were included in ESB programs, and another 12 in EEP programs in which the park participated. It also coordinates one of them, Callithrix geoffroyi, or white-headed marmoset.

References 

Botanical gardens in Spain
Zoos in Spain